Willard Straight Hall is the student union building on the central campus of Cornell University in Ithaca, New York. It is located on Campus Road, adjacent to the Ho Plaza and Cornell Health.

Background
The construction of Willard Straight Hall was initiated by Willard Dickerman Straight's widow, Dorothy Payne Whitney, as a memorial to her husband. The building was intended to lead to "the enrichment of the human contacts of student life", according to the speech Straight gave at the dedication of the hall. Cornell historian Corey Earle notes that in the era Willard Straight Hall was constructed, "it was unusual to have a building with no academic purpose". The concept of a "student union" building was a recent invention at the time—the first student union in North America, Houston Hall at the University of Pennsylvania, had opened in 1896. When Willard Straight Hall opened its doors in 1925, it was still one of only a few such structures in the country dedicated to student life. However, Cornell provided on-campus space for student organizations since its earliest days.  In January 1870, Andrew Dickson White allocated a large room in the middle section of White Hall to be used as a "Society Hall." White donated $1,000 to furnish it subject to $300 in matching gifts from student organizations.  Later, Barnes Hall was built to house the Students’ Christian Association in 1888.

In 1918, recently widowed, Dorothy Whitney Straight met a Cornell Agriculture student, Leonard Knight Elmhirst, who persuaded her to visit the campus. Elmhirst and Straight together with certain faculty members decided that the best realization of Willard Straight's wish that some of his estate be used to make Cornell a more "human place" was to build a student union building. Elmhirst graduated from Cornell and left for India in 1921. For the next three years, Dorothy Straight oversaw planning for Willard Straight Memorial Hall, which was to be built with part of her Whitney family fortune in addition to Willard Straight's bequest. The cornerstone was laid on June 15, 1924, and the dedication ceremony was held on November 25, 1925. Elmhirst and Dorothy Straight had been married in April 1925.

Leonard Elmhirst came from a land-owning family in Yorkshire, England. The seeds for his study of agriculture in Ithaca, NY and subsequent Dartington Hall School and "Institute for Rural Reconstruction' in the agriculturally impoverished England of the 1920s were sown on his first visit to India during World War I.

Design

Willard Straight Memorial Hall was designed by a noted architect of the day, William Adams Delano, and constructed from the local "llenroc" bluestone, a feldspathic sandstone; the architectural model for its Gothic revival style may have been the 14th-century Dartington Hall in Devon, which the newlyweds purchased in 1925.

Murals in the lobby by Ezra Winter date from 1926 and represent Willard Straight's business interests in China and his enthusiasm for the arts. The murals depict virtues as chivalry, adventure, diplomacy, creativity, and optimism.

History

Opening
Willard Straight Hall opened in November 1925, following twenty months of construction at a cost of $1.5 million to construct, and $100,000 to furnish. 4,800 people streamed into the building to see it on opening day, and 3,000 more on the following day. Access to the building was by membership only. All undergraduates were automatically members, but faculty, trustees, and grad students could pay for the privilege at $8 per year, and alumni could join for $5 per year.

Access for women

Dorothy Straight's preference was for the building to be equally accessible to men and women, but she encountered strong faculty opposition. As a compromise, the larger main entrance would be restricted to men, and women would be permitted to enter via the smaller south entrance; Straight's hope was that women would subsequently have access to the main central area of the building. However, on the building's opening in 1925, women were restricted to the use to two lounges and a rest room near the south entrance. Ten years later, the food service areas were opened to women. During World War II, women were given access to the entire building except the barber shop. It was not until 1977 that the barber shop, and thus the whole building, was finally integrated to both sexes.

From Willard Straight Hall's opening, the main desk was staffed by undergraduate students. In addition, the building's policies are set, updated, and enforced by the student-led Willard Straight Hall Board of Governors, more commonly known on campus as the Willard Straight Hall Student Union Board (SUB).

Prior to 1969, the upper floors of the Straight served as a hotel for Cornell's visitors and guests. The broadcast studios of the WVBR Radio station were in a lower level.  The building also housed the University Theatre, where until 1988 the Cornell Dramatic Club (formed in 1925 from the merger of the Dramatic Club and the Women's Dramatic Club) staged almost 50 performances a year.

As Cornell built more dormitories on the West Campus and the North Campus, two additional buildings supplemented the Straight to serve students: Noyes Center on West Campus and the North Campus Union (now Robert Purcell Community Center) on North Campus. The combined operation constituted the Department of University Unions. In 1970, with the advent of the University Senate, University Unions became a part of the new Division of Campus Life. In order to end duplication and tensions between the University Unions and the Dean of Students Office, University Unions merged into the latter department.

1969 building takeover

In the 1968–69 school year, the university judicial system was the center of a controversy in connection with the disciplining of African-American students who had engaged in a protest. It was also directly related to the burning of a cross on the lawn of the Wari House, the dormitory for African-American women on campus. (Ithaca police reportedly suspected, but never proved, that the cross was burned by members of the campus Afro-American Society as a pretext for further protest). As racial tensions escalated, some African-American students demanded amnesty for the accused protesters as well as the establishment of an Africana Studies center. On April 19, 1969, some of them occupied Willard Straight Hall, ejecting parents who were visiting for "Parents Weekend" from the hotel rooms on the upper floors. Subsequently, white students from Delta Upsilon fraternity unsuccessfully attempted to retake the building by force. Some of the occupying students left the building and returned with firearms in case of a further attack. Then the Students for a Democratic Society (SDS) led by C. David Burak formed a protective cordon outside the building.

Ultimately, the Cornell Administration, particularly Vice President Steven Muller, negotiated an end to the building takeover.  The photos of the students marching out of the Straight carrying rifles and wearing bandoleers made the national news and won a Pulitzer Prize for Associated Press photographer Steve Starr.

On campus, the Straight takeover led to the formation of the University Senate, a restructuring of the Board of Trustees, a new campus judicial system, and the foundation of the Africana Studies and Research Center. By the end of the academic year, Cornell President James Perkins resigned. It also led to the creation of the Cornell Africana Studies and Research Center in late 1969, but the building it was housed in was burned down by a racially motivated arson attack less than a year after its creation.

Beyond Cornell, the Straight takeover led to the New York State Legislature enacting the Henderson Law, which required each college to adopt "Rules of the Maintenance of Public Order." Vice President Spiro Agnew referred to the Straight Takeover in speeches as an example of the excess of college students. Economist Thomas Sowell would later refer to the takeover as the result of policies intended to "increase minority student enrollment... by admitting students who would not meet the existing academic standards at Cornell." In Sowell's opinion, some of the militants accepted "turned out to be hoodlums who terrorized other black students".

2017 protest
In a move reminiscent of the 1969 takeover, 300 marchers again occupied Willard Straight Hall for a few hours after presenting a list of demands to president Martha Pollack. The protest, led by Black Students United, was a response in part to the assault of a black Cornell student a few days earlier.

Facilities
Willard Straight Hall has always served as a space for socializing and informal connection between students. Over the years, the building has evolved and changed significantly. At various times the building has featured an information desk, a Game Room with billiards and ping pong, a Browsing Library, a tea room (for women), a barber shop, movie theater, dining halls, an Art Room, a Music Room, a lost-and-found, a newsstand, a live performance theatre with orchestra pit and rotating stage, a ceramics studio, an ice cream shop, television lounges, spaces for meetings and coffeehouses, and offices for student organizations. The Ivy Room was originally built as a mess hall for servicemen during World War II. The building once held guest rooms on the fifth floor for alumni and visitors. A photographic darkroom opened in 1939, was expanded in 1973, and closed its doors in 2006. Celebrations were held to observe the building's 25th anniversary in 1950, and its 75th anniversary in 2000.

Current facilities

The building currently encloses several dining facilities (Okenshields, The Ivy Room, and The Bears Den), and lounge spaces for students.  A lounge on the south end of the building is named in honor of Leonard Elmhirst. Special facilities include: Several multi-purpose rooms used for dance and performance troupes, Cornell Cinema (in the Straight Theater), a full service digital computer lab, newly remodeled 2nd floor Elizabeth Staley Office of Student Support and Diversity Education, 5th floor Student Activities Office, Office of Fraternity and Sorority Affairs, offices and mailboxes for student organizations, the 4th Floor WSH Art Gallery, and the  Browsing Library, International Lounge, and Music Room.  It formerly housed the Cornell Ceramics Studio, which closed in May 2011. A long-running joke among students concerns the placement of a power outlet on the ceiling of the staircase leading down to the Ivy Room.

The offices of Cornell Cinema and the Dean of Students Office are also in the building.

During the Fall 2020 Semester, a COVID-19 surveillance testing facility opened on the 4th floor of the building.

Limitations
Due to its age, the Straight has many outdated facilities, such as poor heating, ventilation, and acoustics. Amenities such as teleconferencing and modern air conditioning are restricted by the ancient electrical system, and the building is not adequately wheelchair accessible.

Further reading
Leonard Knight Elmhirst, The Straight and Its Origin, 1975, OCLC 2046429 originally serialized in Cornell Alumni News, 1974–75
Peter Pennoyer and Anne Walker, The Architecture of Delano & Aldrich, Norton, 2003,

External links
 History of Willard Straight Hall (video)
 Official Board of Governors Home Page (SUB)

References

Cornell University buildings
Student activity centers in the United States
Buildings and structures completed in 1925
Delano & Aldrich buildings
Gothic Revival architecture in New York (state)
1925 establishments in New York (state)